Life of Gabriel of Qartmin is a Syriac 8th-century manuscript containing the life of Gabriel of Beth Qustan, Bishop of Tur Abdin, which helps to provides a glimpse into the events in the Middle East during the 7th century.

The quote below provides an example of the Dhimmi agreements of Christians during the Arab conquests.
This lord Gabriel went to the ruler (ahid shultana) of the sons of Hagar, who was Umar bar Khattab, in the city of Gezirta. He (Umar) received him with great joy, and after a few days the blessed man petitioned this ruler and received his signature to the statutes and laws, orders and prohibitions, judgements and precepts pertaining to the Christians, to churches and monasteries, and to priests and deacons that they do not give the poll tax, and to monks that they be freed from any tax (madatta). Also that the wooden gong should not be banned and that they might chant hymns before the bier when it comes out from the house to be buried, together with many [other] customs. This governor (shallita) was pleased at the coming to him of the blessed man and this holy one returned to the monastery with great joy. (Gabriel of Qartmin, Life XII, 72 [p. 123])

However, as Robert Hoyland has pointed out, the ostentatious worship described in the Life of Gabriel of Qartmin, including the use of the wooden gong and chanting before a bier, did not become a literary theme until the eighth century; this shows that this account is a later fabrication, and belongs to the genre of documents which sought to delineate the ideal Muslim-Christian treaty and endow it with authority by attributing it to famous Muslim figures. Rather than being representative of the Dhimmi agreements of Christians during the Arab conquests, it represents the type of agreement that eighth-century Christians sought to legitimise.

References

Syriac manuscripts
Texts in Syriac
Christian hagiography